Kaka Point is a small town at the northern edge of The Catlins, an area of the southern South Island of New Zealand. It is located 14 km south of Balclutha and 8 km north of the headland of Nugget Point. It has a seasonally fluctuating population, and there are numerous cribs (holiday homes) at the settlement. The settlement's best known resident was Māori poet Hone Tūwhare, who lived in Kaka Point for many years until his death in 2008. Kaka Point is named for the kākā bird, whose signature call is "ka-aa."

There is a restaurant, a motel, bed and breakfasts and camping grounds.

Demographics
Kaka Point is described by Statistics New Zealand as a rural settlement.

Kaka Point had a population of 231 at the 2018 New Zealand census, an increase of 9 people (4.1%) since the 2013 census, and an increase of 30 people (14.9%) since the 2006 census. There were 114 households. There were 114 males and 117 females, giving a sex ratio of 0.97 males per female. The median age was 54.5 years (compared with 37.4 years nationally), with 33 people (14.3%) aged under 15 years, 12 (5.2%) aged 15 to 29, 120 (51.9%) aged 30 to 64, and 63 (27.3%) aged 65 or older.

Ethnicities were 96.1% European/Pākehā, 3.9% Māori, and 1.3% other ethnicities (totals add to more than 100% since people could identify with multiple ethnicities).

Although some people objected to giving their religion, 53.2% had no religion, 39.0% were Christian, 1.3% were Buddhist and 1.3% had other religions.

Of those at least 15 years old, 33 (16.7%) people had a bachelor or higher degree, and 54 (27.3%) people had no formal qualifications. The median income was $35,600, compared with $31,800 nationally. The employment status of those at least 15 was that 99 (50.0%) people were employed full-time, 30 (15.2%) were part-time, and 3 (1.5%) were unemployed.

References

  

Clutha District
Populated places in Otago
The Catlins